The fourth season of the American political drama television series The West Wing aired in the United States on NBC from September 25, 2002 to May 14, 2003 and consisted of 23 episodes.

Production 
After the difficulties Aaron Sorkin encountered in writing Season 3, he saw Season 4 as a return to the form he and the show had previously enjoyed, saying "[we] came back to work, after the hiatus, and didn't feel any of that, just felt the week-to-week pressure of trying to write well." In 2003, at the end of the fourth season, Sorkin and fellow executive producer Thomas Schlamme left the show due to internal conflicts at Warner Bros. TV not involving the NBC network, thrusting producer John Wells into an expanded role as showrunner. Rob Lowe departed the series after episode 17, saying he was not happy with his character Sam Seaborn and believed he did not fit in the show anymore. 

On December 11, 2015, in an interview with the Archive of American Television, producer John Wells said that Sorkin was unhappy with two of the cast members, and wanted one in particular removed from the show. NBC disagreed, but Sorkin "just stopped writing the character." As the season progressed, with ratings cresting and episodes consistently going over-budget, Wells told Sorkin he would have to be more responsive to the demands of the network and the studio. When a meeting with Warner Bros. executives, backed by NBC, was held at the end of the season, Sorkin declined to make any changes to the way he worked, and quit the show.

Cast 
The fourth season had star billing for ten major roles. Nine of these were filled by returning main cast members from the third season. Rob Lowe received star billing for the episodes in which he appeared, while Martin Sheen received the final credit for his role as President Josiah Bartlet. The rest of the ensemble, including (from episode eleven) Joshua Malina, were credited alphabetically. Rob Lowe departed in episode seventeen. Channing was only credited for the episodes in which she appeared.

Main cast 
 Rob Lowe as Sam Seaborn
 Stockard Channing as Abbey Bartlet
 Dulé Hill as Charlie Young
 Allison Janney as C. J. Cregg
 Joshua Malina as Will Bailey
 Janel Moloney as Donna Moss
 Richard Schiff as Toby Ziegler
 John Spencer as Leo McGarry
 Bradley Whitford as Josh Lyman
 Martin Sheen as Josiah Bartlet

Plot 
The fourth season covers the end of Bartlet's fourth year of his first term in office through the beginning of the first year of his second term. The season begins with the continuation of the election storyline with the president touring the nation and his staff trying to firm up presidential debates. The storyline ends in a clear victory for Bartlet less than halfway through the season in "Election Night". Other plots include Sam leaving the White House to run in a special election in California, the news of the Abdul Shareef assassination resonating both inside and outside the U.S., Will Bailey taking Sam's position after coming over from the California campaign's staff, the President and his staff facing the reality of an overseas genocide, and Vice President Hoynes being forced to resign after a sex scandal is uncovered. The fourth season ends with Bartlet's youngest daughter being taken hostage. Bartlet ends up invoking the 25th Amendment in the final episode, "Twenty Five." Since no one had been nominated to replace Hoynes, the presidency passes to the iron-willed conservative Republican Speaker of the House, Glen Allen Walken.

Episodes

Reception

Critical response
On Rotten Tomatoes, the season has an approval rating of 86% with an average score of 6 out of 10 based on 7 reviews.

Accolades
The fourth season received 15 Emmy Award nominations for the 55th Primetime Emmy Awards, winning a total of 2 awards. The series won its fourth consecutive and final award for Outstanding Drama Series. Christopher Misiano won the season's other award, for Outstanding Directing for a Drama Series for "Twenty Five". Notable nominations included Martin Sheen for Outstanding Lead Actor in a Drama Series, Allison Janney for Outstanding Lead Actress in a Drama Series, John Spencer and Bradley Whitford for Outstanding Supporting Actor in a Drama Series, Stockard Channing for Outstanding Supporting Actress in a Drama Series, and Tim Matheson and Matthew Perry for Outstanding Guest Actor in a Drama Series. Aaron Sorkin was nominated for Outstanding Writing for a Drama Series for "Twenty Five".

Thomas Del Ruth received a nomination from the American Society of Cinematographers for the episode "Holy Night".

References

General references

External links
 

 
2002 American television seasons
2003 American television seasons